An annulus in botany is an arc or a ring of specialized cells on the sporangium. These cells are arranged in a single row, and are associated with the release or dispersal of spores.

Ferns

In leptosporangiate ferns, the annulus located on the outer rim of the sporangium and serves in spore dispersal. It consists typically of a ring or belt of dead water-filled cells with differentially thickened cell walls that stretches about two-thirds around each sporangium in leptosporangiate ferns. The thinner walls on the outside allow water to evaporate quickly under dry conditions. This dehiscence causes the cells to shrink and a contraction and straightening of the annulus ring, eventually rupturing the sporangial wall by ripping apart thin-walled lip cells on the opposite side of the sporangium. As more water evaporates, air bubbles form in the cells causing the contracted annulus to snap forward again, thus dislodging and launching the spores away from the plant. The type and position of the annulus is variable (e.g. patch, apical, oblique, or vertical) and can be used to distinguish major groups of leptosporangiate ferns.

Mosses

In mosses, an annulus is a complete ring of cells around the tip of the sporangium, which dissolve to allow the cap to fall off and the spores to be released.

Footnotes
 Noblin et al. (2012) The Fern Sporangium: A Unique Catapult. Science 335 (6074): 1322.

Plant anatomy